Alternative science may refer to:

 Fringe science, ideas whose attributes include being highly speculative or relying on premises already refuted
 Protoscience, an emerging field of study which is still not completely scientific, but later becomes a proper science
 Pseudoscience, consisting of statements, beliefs, or practices that claim to be both scientific and factual but are incompatible with the scientific method

See also
 Alternative (disambiguation)
 Science (disambiguation)